Mega Express Four is a fast roll-on/roll-off ferry owned by Corsica Ferries - Sardinia Ferries and operated on their routes from Nice and Toulon to Ile Rousse. She was built in 1995 by Schichau Seebeckwerft in Bremerhaven, Germany for Superfast Ferries as Superfast II. Between 2003 and 2006 she sailed for TT-Line as Spirit of Tasmania III.

Concept and construction
Superfast II was the second ship built for Superfast Ferries for its Adriatic Sea services from Patras to Ancona. Her construction was identical to that of MS Superfast I.

Service history

1995–2003: Superfast II
Superfast II entered service on 11 June 1995 on Superfast Ferries' Patras to Ancona route. In April 1998, following the delivery of the new , Superfast II was transferred to the Patras—Igoumenitsa—Bari route. From October 1999 until January 2000 she returned to the Patras—Ancona route as a replacement for  that was undergoing repairs after an onboard fire. In July 2003 Superfast II was sold to TT-Line, with a delivery date set in September of the same year. TT-Line had already purchased Superfast III and Superfast IV the previous year, renaming them Spirit of Tasmania II and Spirit of Tasmania I, respectively.

2003–2006: Spirit of Tasmania III

TT-Line took over the ship on 30 September 2003 and renamed her Spirit of Tasmania III. She subsequently sailed to Hobart, Tasmania, where she was refitted for her new service. On 15 January 2004 she entered service on TT-Line's new Sydney—Devonport route. Passenger demand for the new service proved smaller than had been expected, and the low passenger numbers combined with rising fuel costs led to the Government of Tasmania's decision to terminate the service in August 2006. As a result, Spirit of Tasmania III was put up for sale.

On 17 July 2006 Spirit of Tasmania III was sold to Mediterranean operator Corsica Sardinia Ferries for €65 million (A$111 million). The ship left on her final voyage for TT-Line on 27 August 2006.

2006 onwards: Mega Express Four
Corsica Sardinia Ferries took over Spirit of Tasmania III on 5 September 2006 and renamed her Mega Express Four. She entered service for her new owners in November of the same year. Between January and April 2007 she was rebuilt at the Megatechnica shipyard in Perama, Greece with an expanded aft superstructure. She returned to service on 4 May 2007.

See also
Bass Strait ferries

References

External links
 
 

Ships built in Bremen (state)
Bass Strait ferries
1995 ships
Superfast I-class fast ropax ferries